Thomas Freeborn (August 14, 1774December 15, 1846) was a 19th-century American New York Sandy Hook maritime pilot. He was best known for being a pilot on the pilot boat Blossom, who lost his life while on board the steamship John Minturn. The Pilots' Monument was built in 1847 at the by the New York pilots in 1847 at the Green-Wood Cemetery in Brooklyn, New York City in memory of Thomas Freeborn.

Early life

Thomas Freeborn was born on August 14, 1774 in Nantucket, Massachusetts. Freeborn married Alice Fish (1774-1848) on September 7, 1796 in Nantucket and had 12 children.  He was the son of George Freeborn (1740-1815) and Susanna Paddack (1734-1802). Freeborn married Alice Fish (1774-1848) on September 7, 1796 in Nantucket and had 12 children.

Career

Captain Thomas Freeborn was a New York Sandy Hook harbor pilot. He helped guide steamships into the New York Harbor. He was assigned the pilot boat Blossom.

Disaster at sea

On February 14, 1846, Freeborn was on the pilot boat Blossom, cruising at sea outside Mantoloking, New Jersey, when he sighted the packet ship John Minturn from New Orleans. Pilot Freeborn went on board the John Minturn to guide her safely to port but ran into trouble when trying to guide the ship in a terrible icy hurricane. The ship was pushed toward the Jersey Shore and ran ashore on Squan Beach. Attempts were made to help the stranded vessel. A yawl was launched with six crewment abord that reached the shore safely. Thirty-eight out of fifty-one persons perished including Thomas Freeborne and Minturn's Captain Dudley Stark, his wife, son, and daughter.

Freeborn's death was commemorated in an 1846 lithograph by James D. Smillie and one by Nathaniel Currier of Currier and Ives, which shows visitors to Green-Wood paying respects at the monument to pilot Thomas Freeborn.

Death

The remains of Captain Freeborn were recovered and brought to the city. A funeral took place on February 24, 1846 from the residence of his mother in New York City. A funeral procession occurred for Freeborn with many of the Sandy Hook pilot boats gathered together to pay their respects.

Legacy

The Pilots' Monument was built in 1847 and is located at Battle Avenue standing upon one of the highest points, at the top of Battle Hill in the Green-Wood Cemetery. It was erected by the New York pilots in memory of their comrade Thomas Freeborn.

The steam tug USS Thomas Freeborn was launched on November 17, 1860. She was named after Captain Thomas Freeborn who lost his life in the discharge of his duty on board the ship John Minturn.

See also

 List of Northeastern U. S. Pilot Boats

References

External links
 THE PILOT’S MONUMENT
 Undiminished Violence: The John Minturn Storm of 1846 by Thomas G. Clark
 THE JOHN MINTURN STORM OF 1846
 Disaster! Stories of Destruction and Death in Nineteenth-Century New Jersey

1919 deaths
1832 births
People from Brooklyn
Maritime pilotage
Sea captains